Paul Essien is a Ghanaian politician and member of the Seventh Parliament of the Fourth Republic of Ghana representing the Jomoro Constituency in the Western Region on the ticket of the New Patriotic Party.

Education 
He attended Nass Senior High School for his Ordinary level certificate and for his Advanced Level of he moved to Nsein Senior HIgh School. He also has a Bachelor Science degree in Statistics from the University of Cape Coast. Prior to that Essien, had obtained a Higher National Diploma (HND) from Takoradi polytechnic now Takoradi Technical University. He did his mandatory national service at GRA (VAT) from 2007 to 2008.

Career 
Essien is a teacher by profession. He taught as a mathematics teacher whilst serving as a form master and sports teacher at Annor Adjaye Senior High School from 2008 to 2016. He was the District Sports Chairman from 1998 to 2003.

Politics 
Essien is a member of the New Patriotic Party. He is a member of the 7th parliament of the 4th Republic of Ghana representing the Jomoro Constituency. He won the bid to represent the constituency after winning in the 2016 parliamentary and presidential elections. He won in a fiercely contested election against most notably Thomas Elleamo Yankey of the National Democratic Congress and Samia Yaaba Christina Nkrumah of the Convention People's Party who is a former member of parliament (2009-2013) and happens to be the daughter of Ghana's first president Kwame Nkrumah. He won after obtaining 18,694 votes representing 39.49%, whilst Thomas Yankey and Samia Nkrumah had 14,241 votes representing 30.08% and 9,714 votes representing 20.52% respectively.

Essien serves on the Trade, Industry and Tourism Committee and the Judiciary Committee in the 7th parliament.

References

Ghanaian MPs 2017–2021
1975 births
Living people
New Patriotic Party politicians
University of Cape Coast alumni